The 2021–22 Sacramento State Hornets men's basketball team represented California State University, Sacramento in the 2021–22 NCAA Division I men's basketball season. The Hornets, led by interim head coach Brandon Laird played their home games at the Hornets Nest in Sacramento, California as members of the Big Sky Conference.

Previous season
The Hornets finished the 2020–21 season 8–12, 5–9 in Big Sky play to finish in ninth place. They lost to Northern Colorado in the first round of the Big Sky tournament.

Roster

Schedule and results

|-
!colspan=12 style=| Regular season

|-
!colspan=12 style=| Big Sky tournament

|-

Source

References

Sacramento State Hornets men's basketball seasons
Sacramento State Hornets
Sacramento State Hornets men's basketball
Sacramento State Hornets men's basketball